Events from the year 1999 in France.

Incumbents
 President: Jacques Chirac
 Prime Minister: Lionel Jospin

Events
3 March – ratification of the Amsterdam Treaty by the French National Assembly.
17 March – ratification of the Amsterdam Treaty by the Senate.
24 March – Fire in the Mont Blanc Tunnel kills 39 people, closing the tunnel for nearly three years.
13 June – European Parliament election in France.
11 August – a total solar eclipse occurs in the north of France.
September – The Peugeot 607 is launched to replace the unsuccessful decade-old 605.
13 October – Pacte civil de solidarité (a type of civil union) adopted by French Parliament.
12 December – a ship, Erika, breaks up near Penmarc'h spilling 37 000 tons of fuel, causing an oil slick on the Breton, Vendean and Charentaise coasts. Loire-Atlantique is particularly affected.
26 and 28 December – storms Lothar and Martin cause heavy damage with winds reaching 180 km/h. The total damage includes more than 90 dead, 6 billion euros paid by the insurers and 10,000 km2 of forest devastated.

Arts and literature
2 September – Publication of Jean-Marie Guéhenno's "L'avenir de la liberté – La démocratie dans la mondialisation", which examines the problems arising from confrontation between the democracy and globalisation

Sport
27 June – French Grand Prix won by Rubens Barrichello of Brazil.
3 July – Tour de France begins.
25 July – Tour de France ends, won by Lance Armstrong of the United States.

Births

14 April – Matteo Guendouzi, soccer player

Full date unknown
 Certificat d'aptitude à l'enseignement aéronautique, a French national degree for aeronautics and space knowledge
 Mélusine Mayance, actress

Deaths

January
6 January – Michel Petrucciani, Jazz pianist (b. 1962).
19 January – Jacques Lecoq, actor, mime and acting instructor (b. 1921).
24 January – Roger Rondeaux, cyclo-cross racer (b. 1920).
25 January – Henri Rochereau, politician and European Commissioner (b. 1908).
26 January – Jeanne-Marie Darré, pianist (b. 1905).

February
3 February – Luc Borrelli, soccer player (b. 1965)
4 February – Maurice Najman, journalist (born 1948)
12 February – André Devigny, soldier and French Resistance member (b. 1916)
18 February – Andreas Feininger, photographer (b. 1906)

March
12 March – André Nocquet, aikido teacher (b. 1914).
17 March – Jean Pierre-Bloch, French Resistance member (b. 1905).
21 March – Jean Guitton, Catholic philosopher and theologian (b. 1901).

May
25 May – René Gallice, soccer player (b. 1919).

June
9 June – Maurice Journeau, composer (b. 1898).
19 June – Henri, comte de Paris, Orléanist claimant to the French throne (b. 1908).
28 June – Louis Ducatel, politician and businessman (b. 1902).
30 June – Edouard Boubat, photographer (b. 1923).

July to October
16 July – André Martinet, linguist (b. 1908).
30 July – Hermann Panzo, athlete (b. 1958).
22 August – Yann Goulet, sculptor, Breton nationalist and war-time collaborationist (b. 1914).
30 August – Raymond Poïvet, cartoonist (b. 1910).
14 September – Jehan Buhan, fencer (b. 1912).
15 September – Michel Pinseau, architect (b. 1924).
4 October – Bernard Buffet, painter (b. 1928).
27 October – Charlotte Perriand, architect and designer (b. 1903).

November
3 November – Alan Heusaff, Breton nationalist and linguist (b. 1921).
9 November – Claude Ballot-Léna, motor racing driver (b. 1936).
11 November – Alphonse Antoine, cyclist (b. 1915).
21 November – Serge Lang, journalist, alpine skier, and founder of the alpine skiing World Cup (b. 1920).
25 November – Pierre Bézier, engineer (b. 1910).
27 November – Alain Peyrefitte, scholar and politician (b. 1925).

December
6 December – Paul Bacon, politician (b. 1907).
18 December – Robert Bresson, film director (b. 1901).
23 December – Marcel Landowski, composer, biographer and arts administrator (b. 1915).
24 December – Maurice Couve de Murville, politician and Prime Minister (b. 1907).
28 December – Pierre Clémenti, actor (b. 1942).
28 December – Louis Féraud, fashion designer and artist (b. 1921).

Full date unknown
Germaine Dieterlen, anthropologist (b. 1903).
Yann Goulet, sculptor, Breton nationalist and war-time collaborationist with Nazi Germany (b. 1914).
René Le Hir, Breton nationalist (b. 1920).
Laure Leprieur, radio personality (b. 1919).

See also
 List of French films of 1999

References

1990s in France